Svetlana Parkhomenko and Larisa Savchenko were the defending champions but did not compete that year.

Katrina Adams and Zina Garrison won in the final 4–6, 7–5, 6–4 against Claudia Kohde-Kilsch and Helena Suková.

Seeds
Champion seeds are indicated in bold text while text in italics indicates the round in which those seeds were eliminated. The top four seeded teams received byes into the second round.

Draw

Final

Top half

Bottom half

References
 1988 Virginia Slims of Florida Doubles Draw

Virginia Slims of Florida
1988 WTA Tour